Snehalata Bipin Kolhe (born october 9, 1975) is a 13th Maharashtra Legislative Assembly member representing Kopargaon constituency. She is the Bharatiya Janata Party (BJP) state secretary. She is the daughter-in-law of Shankarrao Genuji Kolhe was an Indian politician and the Member of the Legislative Assembly (MLA) and a minister in the Government of Maharashtra.

Early life and career
Kolhe was born on 9 october 1975. She did B.A. in 1998.

In 2014, Kolhe fought from Kopargaon (Vidhan Sabha constituency) and won 13th Maharashtra Legislative Assembly election. She was defeated by Ashutosh Ashokrao Kale of Nationalist Congress Party in 2019 Maharashtra Legislative Assembly election.

Personal life
Kolhe is married to Bipindada Shankarrao Kolhe and they have two sons. Veteran leader Shankarrao Genuji Kolhe was her father-in-law.

References

Maharashtra MLAs 2014–2019
Bharatiya Janata Party politicians from Maharashtra
People from Ahmednagar district
Living people
1975 births